The Secretary for the Treasury (formerly ) was a minister in the Government of Hong Kong between 1989 and 2002, responsible for maintaining the assets of the government. The position was replaced by Secretary for Financial Services and the Treasury in 2002 after merging the position with the portfolio of financial services.

The treasury affairs were handled by the Deputy Financial Secretary before 1989.

List of office holders
Political party:

Secretaries for the Treasury, 1989–1997

Secretaries for the Treasury, 1997–2002

References 

Government ministers of Hong Kong
Treasury